Two thumbs up is a catch phrase from Siskel and Ebert's At the Movies television show.

It may also refer to:
Two Thumbs Up (film), Cantonese film 2015
Two Thumbs Up, compilation album by German acid group Tab Two
"Five Stars and Two Thumbs Up", a song by Danielson from the 2006 album, Ships.

See also
Two Thumbs Down (disambiguation)
Thumbs Up (disambiguation)